This is a list of public art in the London Borough of Redbridge.


Aldborough

Barkingside

Gants Hill

Goodmayes

Ilford

Snaresbrook

Wanstead

Woodford

References

External links
 

Redbridge
Redbridge
Tourist attractions in the London Borough of Redbridge